Erich Leibenguth (31 March 1917 – 2 June 2005) was a German former footballer who played internationally for Saarland as a striker. Having played only five matches, he was Saarland's third topscorer with five goals.

Honours
Allenstein
Gauliga Ostpreußen (1): 1939

Neunkirchen
Ehrenliga Saarland (1): 1949

References

1917 births
2005 deaths
Saar footballers
Association football forwards
Saarland international footballers
Borussia Neunkirchen players
Sportspeople from Neunkirchen, Saarland
Footballers from Saarland